Philipp Ludwig von Seidel (24 October 1821 in Zweibrücken, Germany – 13 August 1896 in Munich, German Empire) was a German mathematician. He was the son of Julie Reinhold and Justus Christian Felix Seidel.

Lakatos credits von Seidel with discovering, in 1847, the crucial analytic concept of uniform convergence, while analyzing an incorrect proof of Cauchy's.

In 1857, von Seidel decomposed the first order monochromatic aberrations into five constituent aberrations. They are now commonly referred to as the five Seidel Aberrations.

The lunar crater Seidel is named after him. His doctoral students include Eduard Study and Hermann Wiener.

The Gauss–Seidel method is a useful numerical iterative method for solving linear systems.

See also 
Seidel triangle

References

External links 
Biography, University of St. Andrews

1821 births
1896 deaths
19th-century German mathematicians